Voultegon is a former commune in the Deux-Sèvres department in Poitou-Charentes region in western France.

On 1 January 2013, Voultegon and Saint-Clémentin merged becoming one commune called Voulmentin.

References

2013 disestablishments in France
Former communes of Deux-Sèvres
States and territories disestablished in 2013
Populated places disestablished in 2013